This is a list of licensed flower growing and exporting companies in Uganda.

 Africa International Tree Centre
 Blessed Events Limited
 Chrysanthemums Uganda Limited 
 Fiduga Limited
 Flower Place Limited
 Fresh Handling Limited
 Holding Limited
 Jackson Uganda Limited
 Jambo Roses
 JP Cuttings Limited 
 Kajjansi Roses Limited
 Mairye Estate Limited
 Melissa Flowers Limited
 Nimu Designs Limited
 Amuru Agroforestry and Flower Limited
 Party Services Florists & Decorators Limited
 Pearl Flowers Limited
 Plants Africa Limited
 Premier Roses Limited
 Rosebud Limited
 Royal Van Zanten Limited
 Rusadia Florists Limited
 Sulma Foods Limited
 Uganda Flowers Limited
 Uganda Heritage Roots Limited
 Uganda Hortech Limited  
 Ugarose Flowers Limited
 Venu Farmers Limited
 Victoria Flower Limited
 Wagagai Limited
 XClusive Cuttings Limited

References

External links
Kenya, Uganda flower earnings wilt as Tanzania exports bloom

Horticulture in Uganda
Floriculture
Agriculture in Uganda